Union Township is a township in Jefferson County, Kansas, USA.  As of the 2000 census, its population was 1,672.

Geography
Union Township covers an area of 42.83 square miles (110.92 square kilometers); of this, 0.13 square miles (0.33 square kilometers) or 0.3 percent is water. The stream of Scatter Creek runs through this township.

Cities and towns
 McLouth

Adjacent townships
 Jefferson Township (north)
 Alexandria Township, Leavenworth County (northeast)
 Tonganoxie Township, Leavenworth County (southeast)
 Sarcoxie Township (south)
 Oskaloosa Township (west)

Cemeteries
The township contains one cemetery, Fowler.

Major highways
 K-16
 K-92

Airports and landing strips
 Threshing Bee Airport

References
 U.S. Board on Geographic Names (GNIS)
 United States Census Bureau cartographic boundary files

External links
 US-Counties.com
 City-Data.com

Townships in Jefferson County, Kansas
Townships in Kansas